Dennis Ray Owens (born February 24, 1960) is a former professional American football player who played nose tackle for five seasons for the New England Patriots.

1960 births
Living people
People from Clinton, North Carolina
Players of American football from North Carolina
American football defensive tackles
NC State Wolfpack football players
New England Patriots players